Istvan "Steve" Mike-Mayer (born September 8, 1947) is a former American football kicker in the NFL from 1975–1980 for the San Francisco 49ers, Detroit Lions, New Orleans Saints, and the Baltimore Colts. His brother Nick Mike-Mayer also played in the NFL.  Mike-Mayer played college football at the University of Maryland, College Park.

1947 births
Living people
Sportspeople from Budapest
American football placekickers
Maryland Terrapins football players
San Francisco 49ers players
Detroit Lions players
New Orleans Saints players
Baltimore Colts players
American people of Hungarian descent